R.I.B. is the sixteenth studio album by the German thrash metal band Tankard released through Nuclear Blast Records on 20 June 2014.

Track listing

Personnel
Andreas "Gerre" Geremia – vocals
Andreas Gutjahr – guitar
Frank Thorwarth – bass guitar
Olaf Zissel – drums

References

2014 albums
Tankard (band) albums
Nuclear Blast albums